Polaroid is a 2019 American supernatural horror film directed by Lars Klevberg, and based on his 2015 short film of the same name. The film follows high schooler Bird Fitcher, who is given a vintage Polaroid camera that holds dark and mysterious secrets. She soon realizes that those who get their picture taken by it meet a tragic death. It stars Kathryn Prescott, Samantha Logan, Tyler Young, and Javier Botet.

Dimension Films announced the film in 2015, with Klevberg set to direct and Blair Butler writing the script. Principal photography began in Halifax, Nova Scotia on March 9, 2017, and was completed in May 2017. The film was set to be released in August 2017, but was rescheduled several times. By October 2018, Lantern Entertainment, which acquired The Weinstein Company/Dimension's assets through its bankruptcy, and 13 Films, an international distribution and finance company, had struck a deal to co-distribute the film internationally.

Polaroid was theatrically released in Germany on January 10, 2019, by Wild Bunch, and in the United Kingdom on June 1, 2019. It was released in the United States on September 17, 2019, on VOD and on October 11, 2019, in select theatres, by Vertical Entertainment, before streaming on Netflix. The film received mostly negative reviews from critics, with criticism aimed towards the film's heavy reliance on jump scares and its plot.

Plot

Sarah and her friend, Linda, are going through a box of her late mother's belongings when they find a Polaroid camera. Linda receives a "like" from her crush, which provokes Sarah to take a photo in lingerie on the Polaroid camera. When the flash goes off, Sarah seems uneasy. Her friend leaves, and Sarah is home alone. When she takes a look at the Polaroid, there is a creepy shadow behind her in the photo of her. Startled, she treats it as a smudge and starts cleaning. She hears eerie sounds in the attic, which she investigates. She gets frightened in the attic and falls, but ends up dangling by her ankles instead of falling to the floor. While feeling a brief moment of relief as her hair dangles in her face, she is then pulled up by an entity and is killed offscreen before her dead body tumbles to the ground.

Shy high school student Bird is given an old Polaroid camera by her co-worker Tyler, who got it from a garage sale. The camera has the initials "RJS" carved into it. Bird snaps a picture of Tyler but later notices an odd smudge-like figure on his photo.

Bird attends a costume party with her best friend Kasey and meets her other friends Mina, Mina's boyfriend Devin, Avery, and Bird's high school crush Connor. She uses her Polaroid camera to take the group's picture and Avery later snaps a selfie with it. Meanwhile, Tyler is killed by the entity, and Sheriff Pembroke informs Bird. At home, Bird sees Tyler's photo free from the shadow, which has mysteriously transferred to Avery's photo.

Avery is killed when the entity snaps her neck. When Bird learns about this, she tries to destroy the camera and attempts to warn her friends. Devin attempts to burn the group photo, but when the flames reach Mina in the photo, her arm spontaneously combusts and the flames cannot be extinguished. Kasey's fingers are slightly singed before Bird stomps out the fire and the photograph restores itself. Mina is taken to the hospital to undergo surgery for her arm; Devin and Kasey stay with her while Bird and Connor leave to learn more about the camera. While in the antique store, Bird is attacked by the entity, which behaves like a photograph: following the same rules as photographic development (i.e. it is sensitive to heat). She questions why she was chased too and notices that her reflection is in the photo's background.

Mina is killed at the hospital by the entity when she is left alone briefly. Devin finds Mina's dead body and blames Bird for her death. Bird and Connor research and discover that the camera was owned by a photography teacher Roland Joseph Sable (RJS) from their school years ago. He was accused of torturing four students and killing three of them while taking maniacal photographs. One of the captives escaped and Roland was killed by police. Devin confronts Bird at the diner and accuses her of being responsible for what happened to Mina. He attempts to take a picture of her as a threat. With Connor and Devin both fighting for the camera, Devin is accidentally snapped by the camera and the shadow transfers to his photo, showing he is next. Devin lunges at Bird, Kasey saves Bird by stabbing Devin's photo with a pencil, injuring him in real life. Devin, upset from being stabbed, becomes aggressive and accidentally slaps Sheriff Pembroke. Devin is detained and is later killed in his cell when Roland manifests and attacks him, but not before telling Bird he realized Mina's death was not her fault.

Connor, Kasey, and Bird learn Roland's wife is alive and visit her. They meet an elderly lady named Lena Sable, who explains that the camera actually belonged to her daughter Rebecca Jane Sable (RJS). Lena explains that Rebecca was "slow," and when gifted with the camera she became very attached to it. As a result, Rebecca was bullied by four classmates, who took the camera and used it to take inappropriate photos of her. She committed suicide out of shame, causing her father Roland to abduct and kill her bullies in a fit of rage. Now even in death, Roland roams, looking for the last bully who escaped to kill him. Lena shows the two a picture of the survivor and they search the yearbooks. Bird finds out that the survivor was Sheriff Pembroke. In an attempt to stop the entity from killing them, Connor takes a picture of Pembroke, who reveals that Roland in truth often sexually assaulted Rebecca; Lena's version of the events was merely just to cover her husband's evil deeds. The four students, including him, were Rebecca's friends trying to warn her of her father's actions upon finding her nude pictures in his possession. Fearing the public would find out, Roland abducted them, prompting Rebecca to kill herself out of misplaced guilt.

Shortly after, Roland manifests and ambushes the group, tearing Pembroke's picture in half, which kills him instantly. Roland stabs through Kasey's leg, impairing her ability to walk. Connor is separated from Kasey and Bird; the girls find safety in the school's showers, with Bird turning on the hot water to create heat, preventing Roland from reaching them. Bird leaves to find Connor, they reunite and she has an idea that involves getting the camera back (having been left where Sheriff Pembroke was killed) and going somewhere where Roland can "fully develop." Roland manifests and drags Connor away, but Bird takes a picture of herself, prompting him to chase her instead. She leads him into the school's dark room, where he is able to fully develop, and sets a trap for him by connecting the camera to a timer, but the photographer, having seen through her plan, manifests in an unexpected area, ambushing her and grabbing her by the neck. As Roland prepares to stab and kill her, she manages to discreetly retrieve the camera and takes a picture of him. Roland is able to knock the camera out of her grasp, but Bird immediately crushes the photo in an attempt to kill him, which in turn crushes Roland in real life (and crushes Bird's fingers, as they were also in the photo). He survives however, and fearing for her life she then resorts to burning it (and doing so, burns her own fingers), disintegrating Roland and finally killing the malevolent spirit for good, where everything had taken place many years ago. She later reunites with her friends, and ultimately throws the camera into a river.

Cast

 Kathryn Prescott as Bird Fitcher
 Grace Zabriskie as Lena Sable
 Tyler Young as Connor Bell
 Samantha Logan as Kasey
 Javier Botet as The Entity
 Katie Stevens as Avery
 Madelaine Petsch as Sarah
 Priscilla Quintana as Mina
 Davi Santos as Tyler Drew
 Keenan Tracey as Devin

 Mitch Pileggi as Sheriff Thomas Pembroke
 Kolton Stevens as Young Pembroke
 Shauna MacDonald as Bird's Mother
 Rhys Bevan John as Roland Joseph Sable
 Emily Power as Rebecca Sable
 Erika Prevost as Linda

Production
Dimension Films spearheaded the feature, an adaptation of the 2015 short film Polaroid, written and directed by Norwegian director Lars Klevberg, who also directed the full length version. Chris Bender, Jake Weiner and Jake Wagner produced with Benderspink, Roy Lee with Vertigo and Petter Onstad Løkke and John Einar Hagen with Eldorado Film, which had produced the short film with Klevberg in Norway.

Filming
Principal photography began in Halifax, Nova Scotia on March 9, 2017.

Release
The film was originally scheduled to be released on August 25, 2017. It was then pushed back to December 1, 2017, before being moved up to November 22, 2017. It was then pulled from the schedule, with plans to release it in 2018. Vertical Entertainment acquired distribution rights to the film, and released it on September 17, 2019, on VOD and on October 11, 2019, in select theaters. As of 2020, the film streams on Netflix.

In October 2018, Lantern Entertainment, which acquired The Weinstein Company's assets through its bankruptcy, including Dimension Films content; and 13 Films, an international distribution and finance company, struck a deal to co-distribute Polaroid internationally. The film was theatrically released in Germany on January 10, 2019, by Wild Bunch. The film was released in the United Kingdom on June 1, 2019.

Critical reception
The Independent reports that it is considered the "worst horror film ever made".

References

External links
 

2019 films
2019 horror films
2010s English-language films
2010s high school films
2010s supernatural horror films
2010s teen horror films
American high school films
American supernatural horror films
American teen horror films
Fiction about photography
Dimension Films films
Demons in film
Features based on short films
Films about photography
Films produced by Roy Lee
Films shot in Halifax, Nova Scotia
Vertical Entertainment films
Vertigo Entertainment films
2010s American films